Nick Jerulle is an American curler. Jerulle played lead on a team out of Hibbing Curling Club in Hibbing, Minnesota which won the US National Championship two times, in 1959 and 1962. The team was a family affair other than Jerulle, consisting of Fran Kleffman at second, Kleffman's son Terry Kleffman at third, and Fran Kleffman's son-in-law Dick Brown at skip.  In 1962 the team went on to represent the United States at the World Championship, which was then called the 1962 Scotch Cup. This was only the second time the United States had competed in the Championship. Jerulle's team finished with a 4-2 record, good enough to earn them the silver medal.

References

External links
 

American male curlers
Living people
Year of birth missing (living people)
American curling champions